The Grand Wizard (later the Grand and Imperial Wizard simplified as the Imperial Wizard and eventually, the National Director) referred to the national leader of several different Ku Klux Klan organizations in the United States and abroad.

The title "Grand Wizard" was used by the first Klan which was founded in 1865 and which existed during the Reconstruction era until 1872. The second Klan, founded in 1915, styled their national leader the "Imperial Wizard." National officers were styled "Imperial" officers. State or "Realm" officers were styled "Grand" officers. For example, a "Grand Dragon" was the highest-ranking Klansman in a given state.

National Leaders of the Ku Klux Klan

This list excludes those Grand or Imperial Wizards of independent Klan factions:

The First Klan (1865–1872)
The Ku Klux Klan was founded by six confederate veterans in 1865 but did not elect a Grand Wizard until after Nathan Bedford Forrest joined in 1867.
 Nathan Bedford Forrest, Grand Wizard, 1867–1869, Forrest resigned in 1869 and ordered the KKK dissolved although the group remained active until 1872

The Second Klan (1915–1944)
 William Joseph Simmons, Imperial Wizard, second Klan, 1915–1922
 Hiram Wesley Evans, Imperial Wizard, second Klan, 1922–1939
 James A. Colescott, Imperial Wizard, second Klan, 1939–1944; Colescott disbanded the KKK in 1944.

The Third Klan (Post-World War II)

Major Klan leaders following the disbandment of the second Klan:
 Samuel Green, Imperial Wizard, Original Knights of the Ku Klux Klan, 1949, Green reformed the KKK in 1946 
 Samuel Roper, Imperial Wizard, Original Knights of the Ku Klux Klan 1949–1950
 Eldon Edwards, Imperial Wizard, Original Knights of the Ku Klux Klan, 1950–1959,
 Roy Elonzo Davis, Imperial Wizard, Original Knights of the Ku Klux Klan, Knights of the Flaming Sword 1959–1964. Both organizations disbanded. 
 Robert Shelton, Grand Wizard, United Klans of America Inc., 1961–1987, Shelton started a new branch of the KKK
 David Duke, Imperial Wizard, Knights of the Ku Klux Klan, 1974–1981, Duke started a new branch of the KKK
 Bill Wilkinson, Imperial Wizard, Invisible Empire Knights of the Ku Klux Klan, 1975–1981, Wilkinson formed a competing branch which, at the time, was the largest national KKK organization
 Stanley McCollum, Imperial Wizard, Knights of the Ku Klux Klan, 1981–1989
 Thomas "Thom" Robb, National Director, Knights of the Ku Klux Klan, 1989–present

Imperial Wizards in the United Kingdom
 James K. Dale, Imperial Wizard, UK Branch, 2014–2017
 Rad U. Estherson, Imperial Wizard, UK Branch, 2017–present

See also
 Ku Klux Klan titles and vocabulary

References

Ku Klux Klan
Titles